This is a list of the busiest airports in Austria. Austria has six airports that are generally used for passenger traffic.

At a glance

2019

2018

2017

2014

2013

2012

2011

2010

References

Au
Airports in Europe